13th Faces of Death was an album released by the death metal band Embalmer on October 13, 2006. It was the band's first and only full-length album. A number of songs, including "Rotten Body Fluids," "There Was Blood Everywhere," and "Into the Oven," were re-recorded for this full-length album.

Reviews weren't generally positive, such as one from CD Baby that claimed that 13 Faces Of Death is "guaranteed to peel back your eggs."

Track listing

References

Embalmer (band) albums
2006 debut albums